St Neots RUFC is a Rugby Union Football Club based in St Neots, Cambridgeshire, England.

History

A rugby union club appeared briefly in St Neots between 1938–39 but was halted due to the outbreak of World War II.  It was not until a quarter of a century later than another club would appear, with St Neots RUFC officially being formed in 1964 at the New Inn.  The first chairman was the pub landlord at the New Inn, Tom Curry, and the first captain Peter Ellis.

Club honours
East Midlands 2 champions: 1989–90
Midlands 5 East (South) champions: 2008–09
Midlands 4 East (South) champions (2): 2014-15, 2017–18

See also
East Midlands RFU

References

External links
Official club website

English rugby union teams
Rugby Union Football Club
Sport in Huntingdonshire